Pharmacis anselminae is a moth of the family Hepialidae. It is known from Italy.

References

Hepialidae
Moths described in 1977
Endemic fauna of Italy
Moths of Europe